Črneška Gora is a dispersed settlement in the hills above the left bank of the Drava River in the Municipality of Dravograd in the Carinthia region in northern Slovenia.

References

External links
Črneška Gora on Geopedia

Populated places in the Municipality of Dravograd